State Road 566 (SR 566) is an approximate , northwest-southeast highway near Plant City, Florida that connects Interstate 4 (I-4) to U.S. Route 92 (US 92).

Route description
State Road 566 begins at the intersection of Branch Forbes Road and Stafford Road, heading east on the two lane Strafford Road.  SR 566 enters Plant City and intersects Interstate 4.  The road continues east through Plant City as a four lane divided highway and ends at the intersection of U.S. Route 92 and Thontosassa Road west of Downtown Plant City, Florida.  The road itself continues south as Thonotosassa Road east of the eastern terminus.

Major intersections

References

External links

566
566
State highways in the United States shorter than one mile